Partial volume may refer to:
Partial volume (imaging)
Partial gas volume